The Radio 2 Breakfast Show refers to a range of programming on weekday mornings on BBC Radio 2 since the station's inception on 30 September 1967. The show's longest serving host to date was Sir Terry Wogan, who worked on the programme for 28 years in 2 separate stints, from 3 April 1972 until 28 December 1984, and again from 4 January 1993 until 18 December 2009. The show's shortest serving host to date was Brian Hayes, who hosted the show from 6 January to 23 December 1992. Since 14 January 2019, the show is now hosted by Zoe Ball. 

One of the show's longest running features has been "Pause for Thought", a short interlude of religious-related opinion at around 7:15am or 9:15 am, similar to "Thought for the Day" on BBC Radio 4's Today. In the 1960s-1970s, Rev. Frank Thewlis was a frequent "Pause for Thought" guest. He would later write a book Think Again, a compendium of his frequent talks given on the "Pause for thought" segment.

History 

 Data supplied by the BBC Genome Project.

Breakfast Special (Various Presenters: 19671970)
From Radio 2's inception in 1967, a breakfast programme was broadcast in tandem with Radio 1 Breakfast, featuring a mix of news, music, traffic and weather reports. Unlike its Radio 1 counterpart which had started with a single presenter, Breakfast Special was a continuation of a BBC Light Programme format which had been running since 1965 with a roster of presenters who hosted in weekly rotation. These included Paul Hollingdale (the very first weekday presenter), Ray Moore, Peter Latham, Bruce Wyndham, and John Dunn. The music played was largely easy listening of the type with which Radio 2 would be particularly associated until the 1990s. An early feature was "Band of the Day", which would feature recordings of standards and traditional jazz by artists such as Sidney Sax, Frank Chacksfield, Syd Dale and Leon Young.

During its first year the Breakfast Show began at 5:30am and ended at 8:30am, at which time Radios 1 and 2 would broadcast the same programme, however in 1968 this was changed to a 9am finish, after which Radio 2 would broadcast its own programme.

John Dunn (19701972)
Dunn became the first permanent presenter of the show on 5 January 1970, with Ray Moore providing cover. The show was still broadcast during this period between 5.30am and 9.00am.

Sir Terry Wogan (First tenure: 19721984)
On 3 April 1972, Dunn was replaced by Sir Terry Wogan (with Dunn moving to begin his long running popular Drivetime show). During the Wogan era, the programme was also moved to a later start time of 7am, with an Early Show preceding it, finishing at 9am. During this period Wogan's cover again principally came from Ray Moore, who presented the Early Show at other times. David Hamilton, who at the time was presenting the Afternoon Show also provided holiday cover. From 3 January 1978 Sir Jimmy Young's programme was moved earlier in the day to follow Wogan, and until the end of its run Wogan's programme was broadcast between 7.30am and 10.00am. Their banter-filled handover became something of a feature. Wogan remained in this role until 28 December 1984; as he left the station for a while to begin presenting his own chat show Wogan on BBC1.

Ken Bruce (19851986)
Wogan was replaced by Ken Bruce, whose first show aired on 7 January 1985. Bruce had presented various Radio 2 programmes after starting at BBC Radio Scotland. Bruce's tenure was brief, his only "crime" apparently being that he "wasn't Terry Wogan". In April 1986 he was moved to the mid-morning slot which, along with brief stints on both the late and early shows in 1990-91, he occupied until 3 March 2023. During the Bruce era, the show was broadcast in a later timeslot between 8.00am and 10.30am.

Derek Jameson (19861991) 
On 7 April 1986, Bruce was replaced by journalist Derek Jameson, in a move which proved controversial at the time, as Jameson, although known on television for his contributions to programmes such as What The Papers Say, was not recognised as a radio broadcaster. Even though he made the show more news-based, Jameson became a popular broadcaster, regularly attracting audiences of 10 million, and remained in the role until 20 December 1991. During the Jameson era, the show was reduced by 30 minutes and moved to an earlier timeslot of between 7.30am and 9.30am. The show has continued to end at 9:30am ever since Jameson took over.

From the start of 1988 until 1990, the programme featured a brief sports desk at 8.31 (an additional sports desk also preceded the start of the programme). The sports desk was removed from the programme when BBC radio's sports coverage transferred to the newly launched BBC Radio 5 in August 1990.

Brian Hayes (1992)
On 6 January 1992, Jameson was replaced by Brian Hayes, who took over what was still a news-based show and proved to be an even more controversial choice, as his perceived acerbic manner was seen as being at odds with what the Radio 2 breakfast programme had become. Subtitled Good Morning UK!, it did not prove popular and it ended on 23 December 1992. During the Hayes era, the show was extended by 1 hour and was moved to an earlier start time of 6:30 am. Hayes remains the show's shortest serving presenter.

Sir Terry Wogan (Second tenure: 1993–2009) 
Hayes was replaced by Sir Terry Wogan, who returned to the programme and the station on 4 January 1993, after the axing of his BBC TV chat show. From here on in, the news based elements of the show were dropped, and it returned to its more traditional music and chat style format. Now entitled Wake Up to Wogan, it was the first time the breakfast show had explicitly been given a title other than a generic 'breakfast' term, or simply the name of the host, During the second Wogan era, the show was at first reduced by 30 minutes and broadcast between 7:00 am and 9:30 am in its first year. From 17 January 1994 until the end of its run, the show was reduced by another 30 minutes to a 7.30 startup. On 7 September 2009, Wogan announced that he would step down as the show's host at the end of that year, moving to weekends to present a  Sunday mid-morning show called Weekend Wogan, starting on 14 February 2010. He presented his final breakfast programme on 18 December 2009, which marked the end of 28 years over 2 stints working on the show.

Johnnie Walker then became the interim host of the programme in the period between Wogan's departure and Evans' arrival, from 21 December 2009 until 8 January 2010. Walker was a regular stand-in for Wogan during his latter years on the show.

Chris Evans (2010–2018) 
Wogan was replaced by Chris Evans, whose first show aired on 11 January 2010. For its first 10 months on air, the show was extended by 30 minutes and broadcast between 7:00 to 9:30, On 11 October 2010, following Sarah Kennedy's retirement from broadcasting in August, the show was on 6:30 to 9:30. On 3 September 2018, Evans announced his departure from the network and his plan to move to Virgin Radio. The last show was broadcast on 24 December 2018 and on 21 January 2019, Evans began the second incarnation of the show on Virgin Radio UK.

The show then used guest hosts Paddy O'Connell, Sara Cox and Mark Goodier in the period between Evans' departure and Ball's arrival, from 26 December 2018 until 11 January 2019.

Zoe Ball (2019–present) 
Evans was replaced by Zoe Ball, whose first show aired on 14 January 2019, continuing with the same timings used in the Hayes era and since 11 October 2010 of the Evans era.

Stand-in presenters 
Stand-in presenters known to have covered the show include:

Ray Moore
David Hamilton
Sarah Kennedy 
Ed Stewart
Johnnie Walker
Richard Allinson
Jonathan Ross
Alex Lester
Ken Bruce
Aled Jones
Graham Norton
Sara Cox
Michael Ball
Fearne Cotton
Matt Lucas
Mark Goodier
Richard Madeley
Ryan Tubridy
Patrick Kielty
Gary Davies
Nicki Chapman
Vernon Kay
Rylan Clark
Dermot O'Leary
Amol Rajan
Paddy O'Connell
Alan Carr

See also
Radio 1 Breakfast

References

BBC Radio 2 programmes
1967 radio programme debuts
British radio breakfast shows
British music radio programmes